Ban Pong station is a class 1 railway station in Ban Pong Town, Ban Pong District, Ratchaburi,  from Thon Buri railway station. The station acts as an interchange point for the Namtok Branch Line from Nong Pladuk Junction, accessible only from the Thanon Srong Pon station, also known as Ban Pong 2.

History 
Ban Pong Railway Station opened in June 1903 along with the opening of the first phase of the Southern Line from Thon Buri station to Phetchaburi station. During the Second World War, the station was used by the Imperial Japanese Army as an unloading point for POWs from Changi Prison in Singapore to come for the construction of the Burma Railway. Some of these POWs were sent to Kanchanaburi Province for the construction of the railway and some to the nearby Nong Pladuk POW Camp.

See also
Ban Pong, Ratchaburi

References

External links
 

Railway stations in Thailand
Railway stations opened in 1903